"Last Night" is a song released by House DJ Ian Carey. The track features lyrics by urban superstar Snoop Dogg and Bobby Anthony.

Track listing
Australian digital single
 "Last Night" – 3:09
 "Last Night" (extended version) – 4:54

Remixes
 "Last Night" (Afrojack Remix) – 5:22
 "Last Night" (Spencer & Hill Remix) – 7:04
 "Last Night" (R3hab Remix) – 4:22
 "Last Night" (Dani L. Mebius Remix) – 6:15
 "Last Night" (Afrojack Dub Edit) – 5:18

Charts

Year-end charts

Certifications

References

2011 singles
Ian Carey songs
Snoop Dogg songs
2011 songs
Songs written by Snoop Dogg
Songs written by Jenson Vaughan